Fredrik deBoer is an American author.

Education 
DeBoer earned his Bachelor of Arts degree in English at Central Connecticut State University, Master of Arts degree in writing and rhetoric at the University of Rhode Island, and Doctor of Philosophy degree in English at Purdue University. His dissertation was titled The CLA+ and the Two Cultures: Writing Assessment and Educational Testing.

Views and career 

DeBoer identifies himself as a "Marxist of an old-school variety".

DeBoer has written for magazines, newspapers and websites. Topics include American education policy, cancel culture, and police reform. He was the communications editor for Kairos: A Journal of Rhetoric, Technology, and Pedagogy until 2017.

DeBoer's first book, The Cult of Smart, was published in 2020 by All Points Books. Gideon Lewis-Kraus, writing for The New Yorker, says the book "argues that the education-reform movement has been trammelled by its willful ignorance of genetic variation." Lewis-Kraus groups deBoer with "hereditarian left" authors such as Kathryn Paige Harden and Eric Turkheimer in their shared emphasis on the importance of recognizing the heritability of intelligence when formulating social policy. Nathan J. Robinson, editor-in-chief of Current Affairs, strongly disputed the accuracy of deBoer's position, saying "the central argument of the book is not just wrong, but wrong in the strongest possible sense of that term. It is based on fallacious reasoning."

DeBoer has been a teacher at both the high school and college level.

Book 

 (2020) The Cult of Smart: How Our Broken Education System Perpetuates Social Injustice. All Points Books, an imprint of St. Martin's Publishing Group.

References

External links 
 
 DeBoer's blog on Substack

21st-century American non-fiction writers
American educators
American bloggers
American male bloggers
American male non-fiction writers
American Marxists
American socialists
Central Connecticut State University alumni
Living people
Place of birth missing (living people)
Purdue University alumni
University of Rhode Island alumni
Year of birth missing (living people)